Dysallacta megalopa is a species of moth of the family Crambidae described by Edward Meyrick in 1889. It is found in Papua New Guinea and in Australia.

It has a wingspan of 27 mm.

References

External links
Images at Boldsystems.org

Moths described in 1889
Spilomelinae